Phyllonorycter argyrolobiella is a moth of the family Gracillariidae. It is known from France.

The larvae feed on Argyrolobium zanonii. They mine the leaves of their host plant. The mine is found in the leaflets, occupying a complete leaflet at the end of the development.

References

argyrolobiella
Moths of Europe
Moths described in 2009